Pru Chapman (14 March 1950 – 24 April 2000) was a New Zealand swimmer. She competed in three events at the 1968 Summer Olympics.

References

External links
 

1950 births
2000 deaths
New Zealand female swimmers
Olympic swimmers of New Zealand
Swimmers at the 1968 Summer Olympics
Swimmers from Wellington City